Władysław Natanson (1864–1937) was a Polish physicist.

Life
Natanson was head of Theoretical Physics at Kraków University from 1899 to 1935.

He published a series of papers on thermodynamically irreversible processes, gaining him recognition in the rapidly growing field. He was the first to consider the distinguishability of photons in the statistical analysis of elementary processes, a precursor of the concept of quantum indistinguishability.  He discovered a quantum statistics, rediscovered 11 years later by Satyendra Nath Bose and generalized by Albert Einstein – the Bose–Einstein statistics.

See also
List of Poles (physicicsts)

Notes

Members of the Lwów Scientific Society
1864 births
1937 deaths
Academic staff of Jagiellonian University
Rectors of the Jagiellonian University
19th-century Polish physicists
20th-century Polish physicists